The Sritattvanidhi ("The Illustrious Treasure of Realities") is a treatise written in the 19th century in Karnataka on the iconography and iconometry of divine figures in South India. One of its sections includes instructions for, and illustrations of, 122 hatha yoga postures.

Authorship
The Sritattvanidhi is attributed to the then Maharaja of Mysore, Krishnaraja Wodeyar III  (b. 1794 - d. 1868). The Maharaja was a great patron of art and learning, and was himself a scholar and writer. Around 50 works are ascribed to him. The first page of the Sritattvanidhi attributes authorship of the work to the Maharaja himself:

{{quote|May the work Sri Tattvanidi, which is illustrated and contains secrets of mantras and which is authored by King Sri Krishna Raja Kamteerava, be written without any obstacle. Beginning of Shaktinidhi.

Martin-Dubost's review of the history of this work says that the Maharaja funded an effort to put together in one work all available information concerning the iconography and iconometry of divine figures in South India.  He asked that a vast treatise be written, which he then had illustrated by miniaturists from his palace.

Contents

The resulting illuminated manuscript, which he entitled the Sritattvanidhi, brings together several forms of Shiva, Vishnu, Skanda, Ganesha, different goddesses, the nine planets (navagraha), and the eight protectors of the cardinal points. The work is in nine parts, each called a nidhi ("treasure").  The nine sections are:

 Shakti nidhi
 Vishnu nidhi
 Shiva nidhi
 Brahma nidhi
 Graha nidhi
 Vaishnava nidhi
 Shaiva nidhi
 Agama nidhi
 Kautuka nidhi

Published editions

An original copy of this colossal work is available in the Oriental Research Institute at the University of Mysore. Another copy is in the possession of the Royal Family of Mysore.  An unedited version with text in Devanagari script was published around 1900 by Khemraj Krishna Das of Sri Venkateshvar Steam Press, Bombay.

In recent times the Oriental Research Institute has published three volumes (Saktinidhi, Vishnunidhi, and Sivanidhi.

Influence on modern yoga

Another important work on the subject is by the scholar of Sanskrit and hatha yoga, Norman Sjoman. His 1996 book The Yoga Tradition of the Mysore Palace presents the first English translation of the kautuka nidhi in the Sritattvanidhi, which provides instructions for and illustrations of 122 postures performed by a yogini in a topknot and loincloth. Some of these poses—which include handstands, backbends, foot-behind-the-head poses, lotus variations, and rope exercises—are familiar to modern practitioners, though most of the Sanskrit names differ from the ones they are known by today, but they are more elaborate than anything depicted in other pre-twentieth-century texts. Sjoman describes the origins of some asanas from a gymnastics exercise manual of the late 19th century, the Vyayama Dipika. Sjoman asserts that the influential yoga teacher Krishnamacharya, who did much to create modern yoga as exercise while teaching in the Mysore Palace, including training the yoga masters B. K. S. Iyengar and K. Pattabhi Jois there, was influenced by the Sritattvanidhi.

The yoga scholars James Mallinson and Mark Singleton note that the Sritattvanidhi, like another late 18th or early 19th century text, the Hathabhyasapaddhati, indicate for the first time that yoga asanas may include "a wide variety of physical exercises, from squat thrusts to rope-climbing". In these texts, the asanas, too, have the sole purpose of making the body firm enough for the practice of the satkarmas.

See also

Wodeyar
Hindu iconography
Illuminated manuscript

Notes

Cited sources

 
 
 
  Contains 20 color plate reproductions of 112 asanas reproduced from the Sri Tattvanidhi.

Further reading 

 
 
 
 
  Contains colour plate reproductions of the 32 Ganapati forms reproduced from the Sri Tattvanidhi.

External links 

 Shritattvanidi, Venkateshwar Press edition

Hindu texts
Kannada literature
Ganesha
Kingdom of Mysore
History of Mysore
19th-century Indian books